The list of parties to the Environmental Modification Convention encompasses the states who have signed and ratified or acceded to the international agreement prohibiting military use of environmental modification techniques.

On May 18, 1977, the Environmental Modification Convention (ENMOD) was opened for signature. North Yemen became the first state to deposit the treaty on 20 July 1977. The treaty came into force and closed for signature on October 5, 1978. Since then, states that did not sign the treaty can now only accede to it.  The instrument of ratification, accession, or succession is deposited with the Secretary-General of the United Nations

As of 2022, 78 states have ratified or acceded to the treaty, most recently the State of Palestine on 29 December 2017. A further 16 states have signed but not ratified the treaty.

As of March 2013 the third review conference had not been scheduled as there were under 10 respondents showing interest in reconvening.

List of parties

States that have signed but not ratified

References

Lists of parties to treaties